The Guide Dogs for the Blind Association, known colloquially as Guide Dogs, is a British charitable organization founded in 1934. The Association uses guide dogs to help blind and partially blind people. The organization also participates in political activism for the rights of those with vision impairments.

The charity's royal patron is the Duchess of Edinburgh, who succeeded Princess Alexandra of Kent as patron in 2021.

The head office is near Reading in Berkshire. The charity has eight regional centres in Belfast, Cardiff, Forfar, Leeds, Atherton, Leamington Spa, Redbridge and Bristol. The regional centres in Forfar, Atherton, Leamington and Redbridge are also guide dog training schools. There are a further 14 community teams in Edinburgh, Glasgow, Newcastle, Hull, Liverpool, Nottingham, Shrewsbury, Birmingham, Welwyn, central London, Maidstone, Reading (based at head office), Southampton and Exeter. There is also a National Breeding Centre near Leamington Spa.

The charity's filed accounts for the year ending December 2019 put income for the year at £122.2 million.

Services
Guide Dogs traditionally trained and matched guide dogs to adults with sight loss. Beginning in the early 2010s, the organisation also started providing services for children and young people who are blind or partially sighted. In 2011, the charity introduced a service called My Sighted Guide, in which volunteers are trained to guide a person whose vision is impaired.

Guide dogs 
The organisation's guide dog service provides a blind or partially-sighted person with a specially trained dog. The charity generally breeds all its own dogs, rather than accepting or choosing animals from external breeders. There are exceptions, including a programme where sperm samples are swapped with other guide dog organisations around the world, to ensure healthy genetic diversity. Labradors, golden retrievers, and German shepherds are the charity’s most common pure breeds. Curly-coated retrievers and two standard poodles are included in the charity’s breeding programme.

Guide dog puppies are usually born in the home of a volunteer breeding dog holder. The volunteers get the young pups used to a typical home. Once the pups are six weeks old, they are taken to Guide Dogs’ National Breeding Centre in Leamington Spa, Warwickshire, where they are health checked and vaccinated. They stay at the centre for a week before moving into the home of a volunteer puppy raiser, who teaches the dog basic obedience skills and familiarises the dogs with shops and offices, cafes and restaurants, and public transport.

After 12 to 14 months, dogs begin their formal training, which lasts around 26 weeks. This includes three to five weeks of intensive work with their new owner.

After six or seven years of service, a guide dog retires. Often, the dogs stay with their owner.

There are currently 4,800 working guide dog partnerships in the UK.

Buddy dogs 
Buddy dogs help children and young people who are blind or partially sighted to build confidence in themselves and trust in their surroundings. Guide Dogs piloted the service in 2011 and launched it as a permanent service in 2012. In 2020, 52 children were partnered with a buddy dog. Buddy dogs are Guide Dogs-bred dogs which haven’t qualified to become a guide dog.

My Sighted Guide 
Guide Dogs first piloted its My Sighted Guide service in 2011, adopting it into the charity’s suite of services in 2012. My Sighted Guide involves connecting someone with sight loss to a trained, local volunteer to make more activities accessible. Guide Dogs can also provide sighted guiding training to the family and friends of a blind or partially sighted person.

Children and young people's services 
Guide Dogs provides the following services to help children and young people with sight loss:

My Time to Play – launched in 2020, this service comprises online and face-to-face sessions to help children aged 0–4 to develop through play, and their parents can also connect with other families affected by sight loss.

My Life Skills – helps children learn skills, including navigating streets safely, preparing food, handling money and managing their appearance. In 2019 Guide Dogs helped 2,845 children through My Life Skills.

CustomEyes Books – provides books in large print, tailor-made to each child’s eye condition. In 2019, CustomEyes made 4,000 tailor-made books.

Family Events – a UK-wide programme of activity days providing the opportunity for children and parents to meet other families and access advice from Guide Dogs’ specialists. Some 1,095 people affected by sight loss attended Guide Dogs’ Family Events in 2019.

Tech for All – In 2021, Guide Dogs is piloting a scheme giving those aged three to 18 with a vision impairment a free iPhone or iPad. The project was launched after the charity’s own research found that technology is a vital tool for people who are blind or partially sighted.

Campaigning 
The charity’s campaigning work covers a range of issues, including making sure children with sight loss are able to access the services they need, and ensuring public transport and streets are as accessible as possible. The charity is assisted by 28,000 volunteer campaigners who sign petitions, share social media posts, write to their MPs and collect signatures on the charity’s behalf.

Research 
The charity has a research programme to provide an evidence base for Guide Dogs’ policies, operational procedures and campaigns. The research is carried out internally and in collaboration with external organisations, helping the charity to understand its service users’ needs and care for its dogs.

The charity has two priority research areas:

Canine science – to support the behaviour, health and wellbeing of the charity’s dogs.

Human behavioural sciences – to support the emotional wellbeing of service users, plus their family and friends.

In 2020, Guide Dogs began a research project called Born to Guide, which is a long-term study into the complex relationships between a dog’s genes and its health and behaviour. The charity hopes Born to Guide will provide new insights into how to breed future generations of guide dogs, with the goal of raising the percentage of pups who go on to become guide dogs.

History and trivia 

The first four British guide dogs – Judy, Flash, Folly and Meta – completed their training with Muriel Crooke and Rosamund Bond at Wallasey, Wirral in 1931, and three years after this the Guide Dogs for the Blind Association was formed. The first permanent trainer for Guide Dogs was Nikolai Liakhoff, who came to England in 1933. In 1941, the organisation's premises at The Cliff in Wallasey was commandeered for war purposes and the Guide Dogs moved to new premises in the centre of England at Leamington Spa.

In 1956, Guide Dogs began to recruit volunteers to become puppy walkers. A few years later, a breeding programme was introduced and by 1970, these components of Guide Dogs’ work had grown so much they were given their own premises at Tollgate House, near Leamington Spa. The most influential figure in the development of Guide Dogs’ puppy walking and breeding programmes was Derek Freeman.

In 1964, the children's television programme Blue Peter followed the training of two guide dog puppies, Cindy and Honey. This feature has been repeated in the early 1980s, in 2006 with Andy Akinwolere with a puppy named Magic and in 2014 with another puppy, Iggy.

Guide Dogs holds the Guinness World Record for the largest number of guide dogs trained by an organisation, which stands at 33,910 guide dogs by the end of 2016.

The charity also holds world records for the Largest Virtual Tea Party, achieved in April 2020 when thousands of people posted a photo of themselves enjoying a cup of tea at home on Guide Dogs’ Facebook page.

In 2021, the charity celebrated the 90th anniversary of the UK’s first four guide dog partnerships with a host of activities including an artisan sensory garden at the RHS Chelsea Flower Show.

See also
List of Guide Dog Schools
Bradbury Fields – fellow members of the Merseyside Forum for Local Providers

References

Sus

External links

1934 establishments in the United Kingdom
Charities based in Berkshire
Animal charities based in the United Kingdom
Blindness organisations in the United Kingdom
Guide dogs
Charities for disabled people based in the United Kingdom
Organizations established in 1934
Dogs in the United Kingdom
Pets in the United Kingdom